The Region of Murcia autonomous football team is the regional football team for the Region of Murcia, Spain. They are not affiliated with FIFA or UEFA, because it is represented internationally by the Spain national football team. It only plays friendly matches.

History
Before the creation of the Football Federation of the Region of Murcia in 1924, the Valencian Football Federation (at the time known as the Levante Football Federation) absorbed the clubs from the provinces of Murcia and Albacete. Thus, the teams from the regions of Valencia and Murcia had the same federation and it was in charge of organizing the Levante Championship and summoning the national team from Levante, which competed twice in the Prince of Asturias Cup, an inter-regional competition organized by the RFEF. The Valencian team participated in the 1922–23 and 1923–24 editions of the tournament and was eliminated in the quarter-finals by Andalusia on both occasions. On 27 July 1924, the Murcian and Albacete clubs left the Levante Football Federation to create their own on 7 September 1924, then named the Murcian Regional Federation of Football Clubs, only adopting the current name in 1990.

The Murcia national team only played their first international game on 28 December 2005, debuting against Lithuania. The match ended in a 1–1 draw, with the author of the team's first-ever goal being Javi García. They followed it up with three more matches in three years, winning the first two and drawing the third. Their most recent match was held on 18 May 2011 at the Nueva Condomina against Real Madrid, and Murcia managed to keep their undefeated status by holding the club to a 2–2 draw. The goalscorers of that match include three legends, Pepe via an own goal, Karim Benzema and Cristiano Ronaldo.

Coaches
2005–present: José Antonio Camacho

Selected internationals

Notable players
  Mariano Sánchez
  Toché
  Mista

See also
:Category:Footballers from the Region of Murcia
Valencian Community autonomous football team

References

External links
List of matches in Roon Ba

Autonomous football team
Murcia, Region of